County Offaly is a county in Ireland. It is part of the Eastern and Midland Region and the province of Leinster. It is named after the ancient Kingdom of Uí Failghe. It was formerly known as King's County, in honour of Philip II of Spain. Offaly County Council is the local authority for the county. The county population was 82,668 at the 2022 census.

Geography and political subdivisions 

Offaly is the 18th largest of Ireland's 32 counties by area and the 24th largest in terms of population. It is the fifth largest of Leinster's 12 counties by size and the 10th largest by population.

Physical geography 

Tullamore is the county town and largest town in Offaly and is the 30th largest in Ireland. Offaly borders seven counties: Galway, Roscommon, Tipperary, Laois, Westmeath, Kildare and Meath. The Slieve Bloom Mountains are in the southern part of the county on the border with County Laois. Offaly has the 24th highest county peak in Ireland. The Slieve Bloom Mountains contain the county's highest points including Stillbrook Hill and Wolftrap Mountain which are the county's second and third highest peaks. Croghan Hill rises from the Bog of Allen and is located in northern Offaly.

The floodplain of the River Shannon is in the north-western part of the county. The River Camcor, a Wild Trout Conservation Area, runs through the town of Birr where it joins the Little Brosna River. The River Brosna runs across the county from Lough Owel in Westmeath to Shannon Harbour. Silver River runs through several towns in the south of the county before joining Brosna near the town of Ferbane. The Grand Canal also runs across the county from Edenderry on the north-east to Shannon Harbour before joining the Shannon. The county contains many small lakes from Lough Boora to Pallas Lake and it also contains  of swamp land. There are a number of eskers in the county's landscape including Esker Riada.

Offaly largely comprises a flat landscape and is known for its extensive bog and peatlands. There are many large bogs in Offaly including the Bog of Allen, Clara bog, Boora bog and Raheenmore Bog which are spread out across the county with the Bog of Allen extending into four other counties.

This includes woodlands within the Slieve Blooms and the Lough Boora Parklands. Roughly 75% of Offaly's forested area is Conifer High Forest.

Baronies

The following are the historical baronies of County Offaly:
Ballyboy
Ballybritt
Ballycowan
Clonlisk
Coolestown
Eglish
Garrycastle
Geashill
Kilcoursey
Lower Philipstown
Upper Philipstown
Warrenstown

Towns and villages 

 Ballinagar
 Ballyboy
 Ballycumber
 Banagher
 Belmont
 Birr
 Bracknagh
 Cadamstown
 Clara
 Clareen
 Cloghan
 Clonygowan
 Clonbullogue
 Clonmacnoise
 Coolderry
 Crinkill
 Croghan
 Daingean
 Dunkerrin
 Edenderry
 Ferbane
 Geashill
 Horseleap
 Kilcormac
 Killeigh
 Killoughey
 Kinnitty
 Lusmagh
 Moneygall
 Mountbolus
 Mucklagh
 Pullough
 Portarlington
 Rahan
 Rath
 Rhode
 Shannonbridge
 Shannon Harbour
 Shinrone
 Tullamore
 Tubber
 Walsh Island

Local government and politics

Offaly County Council is the local authority for the county. The council is responsible for local services such as housing policy, social and cultural services, economic development and planning, motor taxation and infrastructural policy in the county.

Under the Local Government Reform Act 2014 the number of councillors was reduced to 19 from 21. The reforms also reduced the number of electoral areas to three: Tullamore (7 members), Birr (6 members) and Edenderry (6 members)..

Until the 2011 general election Offaly was part of the Laois–Offaly constituency which elected five TDs to the Dáil. Between 1921 and 2011 this consisted of the full territory of both counties. For the 2011 general election, some electoral divisions in South Offaly were part of Tipperary North.

The Electoral (Amendment) (Dáil Constituencies) Act 2013 established a new constituency called Offaly for the 2016 general election. The constituency incorporates all of Offaly from the previous Laois–Offaly constituency, and 24 electoral divisions from Tipperary North. This constituency elected 3 TDs to the Dáil. It was abolished in 2020

Since the 2020 general election, Laois–Offaly became a 5-seat constituency again.

History

One of the earliest known settlements in County Offaly is at Boora Bog which dates back to the Mesolithic era. Excavations here provide evidence of a temporary settlement as no structures were found at the site. Stone axes, arrowheads and blades were discovered which date to between 6,800 – 6,000 BCE.

The Dowris Hoard dating from the Late Bronze Age was found in a bog at Dowris, Whigsborough near Birr. It is the largest collection of Bronze Age objects ever found in Ireland.

After Christianisation, the monastic complex of Clonmacnoise was erected at the River Shannon near Shannonbridge. It is today a significant tourist destination.

The county itself was formed following the Tudor plantations of Laois and Offaly in an attempt by the English Crown to expand its sphere of influence in Ireland which had declined following the Norman Conquest of Ireland. Both Laois (Leix) and Offaly (Uí Failghe) were petty kingdoms in Gaelic Ireland located just outside the Pale (a region around Dublin and the mid-east of Ireland that remained loyal to the English Crown following the Norman Conquest). The older kingdoms of Leix and Uí Failghe are not coterminous with the present-day counties that were formed. The Kingdom of Uí Failghe, from which the name Offaly is derived, was ruled by the Ó Conchobhair Failghe (anglicised as O'Conor Faly) whose territory extended from the east of the county into north Kildare. The Kingdom of Firceall ruled by the O'Molloy clan constituted much of the centre of the county. The Kingdom of Firceall was part of the Kingdom of Meath while Uí Failghe was part of the Kingdom of Leinster. Much of the south of the present-day county (as well as northern County Tipperary) was ruled by Ó Cearbhaill of Éile (anglicised as O'Carroll Ely). Ely formed part of the Kingdom of Munster.  These petty kingdoms were swept aside by the Tudor plantations. In 1556, an Act of the Parliament of Ireland created "King's County", named after Philip, the then king of Ireland. This replaced the old Kingdoms with Baronies and the present day County System.

Despite the county's name being upheld as Offaly through the 2001 Local Government Act, no legislation was ever enacted after independence explicitly changing the name from King's County, the name formally established under the 1898 Local Government Act which continued to have legal effect. Legal transfers and assignments of land in the county still refer to it as "King's County".

Places of interest

 Birr in the south of the county is best known for its castle and gardens. Birr Castle is owned by the Parsons family, (the family bears the title: 'Earl of Rosse') and is best known for its 19th-century telescope, the Leviathan of Parsonstown.
 Sculpture in the Parklands around Lough Boora in Boora Bog.
 Charleville Castle located in Tullamore
 Ancient Christian monastic site at Clonmacnoise along with ancient examples of the Irish High cross such as the 'Cross of the Scriptures' and the round tower and visitors centre.
 Kinnitty Castle
 Slieve Bloom Mountains with panoramic views of Counties Offaly and Laois
 Banagher and the river Shannon for cruises along the river.
 The Boora bog reserve is a haven for wildlife and most notably contains the last Irish population of the grey partridge.
 Durrow Abbey and High Cross
 Tullamore Dew Visitor Centre
 Clara Bog Nature Reserve
 Leap Castle
 The Old Churches of Rahan and Lynally
Croghan Hill, a 230-metre (750') high hill where an ancient mummy was discovered. It is known as the Croghan Bog Man. It is now found in the National History Museum.
Moneygall is the ancestral home of the former president of the United States, Barack Obama. Located in the village, is a visitor centre and service station known as the Obama Plaza.

Demographics

The 2006 population figure for County Offaly was the highest for the county since 1881. The Central Statistics Office estimates that the increase in population between 2002 and 2006 (7,205) comprised a natural increase of 2,026 people with the balance of 5,179 accounted for by net in-migration from within Ireland as well as abroad. The population increased by 11.3% between 2002 and 2006 which was a greater rate than the national average rate of 8.2%. This may be attributed to the county's proximity to the Greater Dublin Area, increased accessibility to Dublin (M6, M7, and improved rail services) and lower house prices than in Dublin.

The population of many towns rose during the period 1996 to 2006: Birr +21.5%, Tullamore +28.8% and Edenderry +53.9%. The population of Portarlington increased by 50.1% between 2002 and 2006.

The population as of census 2016 was 77,961 people with 34.7% (27,085 people) under the age of 25 and 13.6% (10,951 people) over the age of 65.

Economy

Traditionally, agriculture and industry have been the main driving force of the economy in the county. Offaly has extensive bogland, particularly in the northern parts of the county, that forms part of the Bog of Allen. Bord na Móna was founded in 1946 and provided employment to hundreds of people in Offaly by making peat briquettes (for home domestic use) and supplying peat to power stations operated by ESB. Peat briquettes are currently made at the Bord na Móna factory at Derrinlough near Birr. Power stations are operating at Shannonbridge and Edenderry. With the continuing depletion of the bogs, a number of power stations have closed down in recent years. The ESB power station at Lumcloon, Ferbane was a major employer in the midlands but closed in 2001. Rhode power station closed down soon afterwards. These were major landmarks in Offaly with large cooling towers that were visible for miles around Offaly and beyond, but were demolished soon after the stations closed. Many bogs are now used as wildlife reserves or for tourism activities such as Lough Boora.

The opening of the Grand Canal in the 18th century brought prosperity to towns such as Banagher and Tullamore. Both towns were important stops on the Dublin to Limerick navigation which supported a number of industries and brought cheap and efficient water transport to the county in that era.

The Celtic Tiger also brought an increase in economic activity to Offaly with business enterprise and industrial parks opening in Birr, Edenderry and Tullamore. Many people particularly in the east of the county are within an easy commuting distance to Dublin where many find employment.

Infrastructure

Transport

Rail

Offaly is well served by rail transport. Railway stations are located at Tullamore and Clara. Both stations are on the main Dublin-Westport/Galway railway line with regular trains serving the area, especially for Dublin commuters. Portarlington railway station is located just over the County Laois border and is in a catchment area for the southeast of the county. Portarlington railway station is on the main Dublin-Cork railway line with regular commuter services to Heuston Station, Dublin and intercity services to Cork, Limerick, Killarney & Tralee.

The Limerick-Ballybrophy railway line travels through the south of the county however there are no railway stations on the line in County Offaly. The nearest stations are located at Cloughjordan and Roscrea both just outside the county boundary. A railway line from Birr connected to the line at Roscrea until it was closed in the 1960s. A controversial railway line also connected Birr to Portumna between 1868 and 1878 and became something of a folk legend.

Road

Three main national secondary routes pass through the county. The N52 road passes from Kilbeggan to Tullamore and Birr which then continues to Nenagh where it intersects with the M7. The N62 from Athlone passes through Ferbane and Birr and continues onto Roscrea and Thurles. The N80 route starts in Tullamore and continues to the southeast passing through Portlaoise and Carlow. There are no main national primary routes in the county, however, the M6 skirts the county to the north and the M7 skirts the county to the south through Moneygall. Road infrastructure has improved with the completion of the Tullamore bypass in 2009 and improved access to regional cities following the completion of the intercity motorway network.

Bus
Bus Éireann provide public transport services throughout the county with regular bus services to Limerick and Waterford from Athlone bus station. Other private bus coach services provide direct bus services from Birr to Dublin such as Kearns bus service which run several services daily. Slieve Bloom Coaches run services from Tullamore and Portarlington to Dublin.

Waterway
The Grand Canal connecting Dublin to the river Shannon was constructed through the towns of Edenderry and Tullamore and joins the Shannon at Shannon Harbour. Traditionally this was an important route for transport, communication and trade between Dublin, Limerick and the midlands of Ireland. The route fell into decline as road transport became more popular. Much of the route is now used for boating and leisure activities.

Media

Radio
Midlands 103 (originally Midlands Radio 3) which broadcasts to Laois, Offaly and Westmeath is based in Tullamore and has studios across the midlands. 
RTÉ's medium wave transmitter broadcasting RTÉ Radio 1 was also located in Tullamore but transmission stopped in 2008.

Print
A number of local newspapers are published in Offaly. The Offaly Independent and Tullamore Tribune are based in Tullamore. The Midland Tribune, based in Birr, covers local news in the west and south of the county as well as parts of northern Tipperary including the towns of Birr, Roscrea and Nenagh and surrounding areas. The Offaly Express was a former newspaper based in Tullamore. It closed down in July 2012 after 29 years in operation. It is now an online news platform for the county at www.offalyexpress.ie

Sport

GAA

Gaelic games are popular in the county. Offaly GAA consists of some 44 clubs playing Gaelic football and hurling in communities throughout the county. Birr is generally considered a hurling stronghold with Birr GAA winning four All-Ireland Senior Club Hurling Championships. County teams have also had national success in both hurling and football, winning the Liam MacCarthy Cup four times and the Sam Maguire Cup three times. The football team is perhaps best known for the Seamus Darby goal in the 
dying minutes of the 1982 football final when Offaly took the title by one point denying Kerry a historic five All-Ireland titles in a row. 
Traditionally, west Offaly has been the hurling stronghold with clubs like Birr, Coolderry, And Kilcormac/Killoughey enjoying success in the Leinster and All-Ireland Championships

Famous hurlers from Offaly include:
Brian Whelahan, Birr
The Dooley Brothers, Clareen
Brian Carroll, Coolderry
Rory Hanniffy, Birr
Shane Dooley, Tullamore
Michael Duignan, Banagher
Famous Footballers from Offaly include:
Matt Conor, Walsh Island
Richie Conor, Walsh Island
Ciarán McManus, Tubber
Niall McNamee, Rhode
Martin Furlong, Tullamore
Seamus Darby, Rhode
Mick Brady, Edenderry
Finbarr Cullen, Edenderry

Association football
Tullamore Town F.C. play at Leah Victoria Park. Previously they played in the A Championship and League of Ireland B Division

Other sports
Other popular sports in the county include rugby and golf. Birr Golf Club and Esker Hills Golf Club near Tullamore are popular. Irish golfer Shane Lowry is a member of Esker Hills. He is from the town of Clara outside Tullamore.  As an amateur, he won the 2009 Irish Open. In 2019, Lowry won The Open Championship in Royal Portrush Golf Club, becoming the first Offaly man to win one of the golfing majors.

Culture

People
George Brent, Hollywood actor
Ged Corcoran, Irish rugby league footballer
Brian Cowen, former Taoiseach, born in Clara, 10 January 1960 and now living on the outskirts of Tullamore
Patrick Cronin, priest, Archbishop of Cagayan de Oro (1970–1988)
Neil Delamere, comedian
Alex Dunne, racing driver
Barry Glendenning, journalist
Rex Ingram, Hollywood silent film director, born in Dublin but lived in Kinnitty
John Joly, scientist, born at Bracknagh in 1857
Shane Lowry, golfer
Mundy, musician
William Parsons, 3rd Earl of Rosse, astronomer; also the father of Charles Algernon Parsons who invented the steam turbine. 
George Johnstone Stoney (1826–1911) Physicist. Born, Oakley Park, Clareen. He introduced the term electron in 1891.
Bindon Blood Stoney (1828–1909) Engineer and inventor. Born, Oakley Park, Clareen.
Seán William McLoughlin (Jacksepticeye), popular YouTuber known primarily for his Let's Plays

See also
 List of abbeys and priories in Ireland (County Offaly)
 Lord Lieutenant of King's County
 High Sheriff of King's County

References

Further reading

External links

Offaly Tourism
The Offaly Express Newspaper
Offaly Historical & Archaeological Society

 

 
Counties of the Republic of Ireland
Leinster
Local government areas of the Republic of Ireland
States and territories established in 1556
1556 establishments in Ireland